Gheorghe I. Cantacuzino (born 1937, Bucharest-2019) was a Romanian historian and archeologist.

Education 
Gheorghe I. Cantacuzino studied at the Sfântul Sava High School, graduating in 1954. Thereafter he attended the courses of  the Faculty of History at the University of Bucharest, specializing in history of the antiquity and archeology. In 1977 he got his doctor's degree at the Institute of Archeology of Bucharest.

Professional activity
Gheorghe Cantacuzino started his professional activity as museologist in Tulcea, where he worked from 1959 to 1961. He then transferred to the Nicolae Minovici Folk Art Museum where he also held a position of museologist from 1961 to 1963.

In 1963 he got a position of archeologist at the Direction of Historical Monuments (renamed "Direction of the National Cultural Heritage" in 1974) where he worked till 1978. He then held the position of chief museologist at the National Museum of Romanian History till 1990.

The change of regime in Romania of 1989 gave George Cantacuzino the opportunity of a breakthrough. In 1990 he was appointed inspector at the "Direction of Historical Monuments, Aggregates and Sites" and in 1994 promoted to advisor of the Direction of Historical Monuments. Finally in 1996 he secured a position of scientific researcher at the "Vasile Pârvan" Institute of Archeology of the Romanian Academy.

Gheorghe Cantacuzino is also vice president of the Commission for the History of Cities in Romania (Comisia de Istorie an Oraşelor din România – CIOR) of the Romanian Academy.

In 2001 he received the Nicolae Iorga prize of the Romanian Academy.

Research
Gheorghe Cantacuzino participated in archeological excavations in several sites such as:

 Bucharest – Mărcuța monastery
 Brădet Hermitage, Argeș County
 Moldovița Monastery Suceava County – ruins  of the old church
 Humor Monastery, Suceava County
 Târgoviște: Princely court, Sf.Vineri church
 Stelea Monastery, Târgoviște
 Poenari Castle, Argeș County
 Vodița Monastery, Mehedinți County
 Tismana Monastery, Gorj County
 Șemlacul Mic, Timiș, Săraca Monastery
 Putna Monastery, Suceava county
 Războieni, Neamț – Ștefan cel Mare, church
 Sânpetru, Hunedoara – Sf. Gheorghe church
 Turnu Citadel, Turnu Măgurele
 Leșnic, Hunedoara – Sf. Nicolae church
 Câmpulung-Muscel – old princely court

Publications

Books
 Cetăţi medievale din Ţara Românească în secolele XIII – XIV, București, Editura Enciclopedică, 2001, 296 p. cu ilustr.;
 Câmpulung. Vechi monumente şi biserici, București, Editura Vremea, 2002, 112 p. cu ilustraţii.
 Mănăstirea Tismana București, Editura Vremea, 2004
 Atlas istoric al oraşelor din România. Seria B. Ţara Românească. Fascicula 1. Târgovişte București, Editura Enciclopedică, 2006.

References

1937 births
2019 deaths
Romanian museologists
Archaeologists from Bucharest
21st-century Romanian historians
Saint Sava National College alumni
University of Bucharest alumni